Zenson di Piave is a comune (municipality) in the Province of Treviso in the Italian region Veneto, located about  northeast of Venice and about  east of Treviso.

Zenson di Piave borders the following municipalities: Fossalta di Piave, Monastier di Treviso, Noventa di Piave, Salgareda, San Biagio di Callalta.

Demographic evolution

References

External links
 www.comune.zensondipiave.tv.it

Cities and towns in Veneto